Revin is a commune in the Ardennes department in the Grand Est region in northern France.

Revin is situated on the banks of the Meuse. The Revin Pumped Storage Power Plant is near Revin.

Population

Personalities
Yazid Mansouri, the Algeria national football team captain was born in Revin.

See also
Communes of the Ardennes department
Former industrial areas in western Europe were hurting even before the economic crisis, by Paul Ames. 12 Feb 2010.

References

Communes of Ardennes (department)
Ardennes communes articles needing translation from French Wikipedia